The Victorian Railways M class are a diesel-hydraulic powered railway shunting locomotive, based at the Newport workshops of the Victorian Railways in Victoria, Australia.

For a period of time the VR had been using old steam locomotives that were past their best to shunt at their Newport workshops, and decided to construct two small shunting locomotives for use at their workshop facilities.

Built by the Victorian Railways themselves, with a Diesel-hydraulic transmission powered by an  EMD power unit, the two engines were given class M and the numbers were 231 and 232. After one trialled at Mildura, both worked their entire operational lives exclusively in the Newport Workshops compound. When introduced both wore red with a yellow stripe livery, but later changed to the traditional VR livery until they were withdrawn.

After withdrawal they both passed to Steamrail. One is operational and is used as the Steamrail shunter (M231) in the original red and yellow livery, but may soon change to VR blue and gold. The other (M232) is currently stored in the Steamrail compound at Newport Workshops West block, pending restoration to a serviceable condition.

Locomotives

References
 Peter J. Vincent: M class
 VICSIG M class
 Vicrailways – M class

 
M class
Clyde Engineering locomotives
Bo-Bo locomotives
Broad gauge locomotives in Australia
Shunting locomotives